Hynhamia diversa is a species of moth of the family Tortricidae. It is found in Ecuador.

The wingspan is about 19.5 mm. The ground colour of the forewings is cream, tinged and partly suffused with yellowish brown. The markings are yellowish brown, but brown at the costa. The hindwings are cream tinged yellowish and spotted greyish costo-apically.

Etymology
The specific name refers to the difference from related species Hynhamia decora and is derived from Latin diversa (meaning different).

References

Moths described in 2011
Hynhamia